Petroglyph Provincial Park is a provincial park located at the south end of the city of Nanaimo in British Columbia, Canada. The park was established on August 24, 1948 to protect a collection of petroglyphs found near the estuary of the Nanaimo River.

Cultural history
The park hosts a remarkably high concentration of petroglyphs that date to at least the 10th century CE. These carvings depict mythological sea creatures, human figures, and animals that are symbolic of the spiritual and cultural history of the Coast Salish and Snuneymuxw First Nations.

The locations of these carvings were almost always made where forces of nature were believed to be especially strong. These areas are usually marked by a natural feature such as a waterfall or rock formation.

Facilities
No facilities are provided at this park.

References

External links

 Petroglyph Provincial Park

Rock art in North America
Provincial parks of British Columbia
Nanaimo
Archaeological sites in British Columbia
Petroglyphs in Canada
1948 establishments in British Columbia
Protected areas established in 1948